The Outlook (1870–1935) was a weekly magazine, published in New York City.

Publication history

The Christian Union (1870–1893)

The Outlook began publication January 1, 1870, as The Christian Union (1870–1893).

The Outlook (1893–1928)

The magazine was titled The Outlook from 1893 to 1928, reflecting a shift of focus from religious subjects to social and political issues.

In 1900, the ranking weekly magazines of news and opinion were The Independent (1870), The Nation (1865), The Outlook (1870), and, with a different emphasis, The Literary Digest (1890).

The Outlook and Independent (1928–1932)

In 1928 The Independent was merged with The Outlook to form The Outlook and Independent.

The New Outlook (1932–1935)

From 1932 to 1935 the magazine was published as The New Outlook. Its last issue was dated June 1935.

Notable contributors

Theodore Roosevelt was an associate editor for The Outlook, after he served as president.
Edwin Arlington Robinson
 In 1900 Booker T. Washington published autobiographical pieces in The Outlook. These pieces were collected in book form and published in 1901 as Up from Slavery. A report by Washington about the new state of Oklahoma was published in the first issue of 1908.  
Alfred Emanuel Smith, Francis Rufus Bellamy, and Harold Trowbridge Pulsifer were editors.
Oscar Cesare was an editorial cartoonist for the magazine.
Benjamin Kidd's interview article, "Future of the United States" (September 1, 1894) made him a celebrity in the United States.
 Robert Cantwell was literary editor of The New Outlook (1932–1935)
 Charles Barzillai Spahr (1860-1904), editor from 1886

Anthologies

A collection of poetry from The Outlook, Scribner's Magazine, Harper's Magazine, and The Century Magazine was published in 1913.

See also
 The Nation (1865)
 The Independent (1870)
 The Literary Digest (1890)

References

External links 

 
 

Weekly magazines published in the United States
Defunct political magazines published in the United States
Defunct magazines published in the United States
Magazines disestablished in 1935
Magazines established in 1870
Magazines published in New York City